Wilter Yap Palma (born March 21, 1958) is a Filipino lawyer and politician from the province of Zamboanga Sibugay in the Philippines. He is currently serving as a Governor of Zamboanga Sibugay.

Political career
Prior to the governorship, Palma served as the municipal mayor of Diplahan, Zamboanga Sibugay from 2004 to 2013.

He was first elected as Governor of the province in 2013 and was re-elected in 2016 and 2019.

Being term-limited, Palma for ran and won to take the open seat in the Philippine House of Representatives for the 1st legislative district of the province replacing his namesake son, Wilter II, who ran but was defeated to take his place in the 2022 local elections in Zamboanga Sibugay.

Personal life
He is the father of former 1st district representative Wilter "Sharky" Palma II.

References

External links
Province of Zamboanga Sibugay

Living people
Governors of Zamboanga Sibugay
Politicians from Zamboanga Sibugay
1982 births
PDP–Laban politicians